Rhopalomyia is a genus of gall midges, insects in the family Cecidomyiidae. There are at least 267 described species in Rhopalomyia. Most species in this genus induce galls on plants in the Asteraceae. This genus has a cosmopolitan distribution. Rhopalomyia was first established by Ewald Heinrich Rübsaamen in 1892.

See also
 List of Rhopalomyia species

References

Further reading

External links
 

 

Cecidomyiinae
Cecidomyiidae genera

Gall-inducing insects
Taxa described in 1892
Taxa named by Ewald Heinrich Rübsaamen